Neville Evelyn Markham (1 February 1926 – 26 April 2000) was a South African cricketer who played first-class cricket for Natal from 1951 to 1957.

Markham was a right-arm fast bowler and useful tail-end batsman. He took his best first-class bowling figures of 6 for 77 on his debut in 1951–52 against Western Province. His highest score was 78, also against Western Province, in 1955–56, when he also took 3 for 29 and 3 for 43 in an innings victory for Natal.
 
His older brother Lawrence, known as "Fish", played one Test match for South Africa in 1949. Both brothers were born in Swaziland Protectorate.

References

External links
 
 

1926 births
2000 deaths
People from Mbabane
South African cricketers
KwaZulu-Natal cricketers